Azygophleps pusilla is a moth in the family Cossidae found in India.

References

Moths described in 1856
Azygophleps
Moths of Africa